The Macaulay Point Battery is a historic gun emplacement in Victoria, British Columbia. A fort was built here between February 1894 and October 1897. The site is now a park.

See also
 Fleming Bay
 Barrett Point
 Stanley Park
 List of World War II-era fortifications on the British Columbia Coast

References

External links 
Defending the Coast contains a picture of the Battery

Forts in British Columbia
History of British Columbia
World War II sites in Canada